The Cornell Big Red football team represents Cornell University in the National Collegiate Athletic Association (NCAA) Division I Football Championship Subdivision (FCS) as a member of the Ivy League. In its 130 active years, the team has played in over one thousand games. The Big Red have been awarded 5 national championships, 3 Ivy League conference co-championships, and 5 times received a final ranking in the Associated Press (AP) Poll. Through the 2018 season, the Cornell Big Red have won 647, lost 553, and tied 34 regular season games.

From its first intercollegiate football game in 1887 against Union College through the 1955 season, Cornell played as an independent program before joining the newly formed Ivy League conference for the 1956 season. As members of the Ivy League, the Big Red have accumulated a conference record of 190 wins, 262 losses, and 5 ties. Since 1915, the Cornell Big Red football team have played their home games at Schoellkopf Field on Cornell's main campus in Ithaca, New York.

Seasons

See also 
 List of Ivy League football standings

References 

Cornell

Cornell Big Red football seasons